Bolivaritettix is an Asian genus of ground-hoppers (Orthoptera: Caelifera) in the subfamily Metrodorinae and not assigned to any tribe.

Species 
Bolivaritettix includes the species:

Bolivaritettix acumindentatus Zheng, Shi & Mao, 2010
Bolivaritettix albus Ingrisch, 2001
Bolivaritettix amphinotoides Günther, 1939
Bolivaritettix apterus Rehn, 1904
Bolivaritettix asperula Bolívar, 1898
Bolivaritettix brachynotus Zheng, 2003
Bolivaritettix brevipennis Deng, Zheng & Wei, 2007
Bolivaritettix celaenotus Zheng, Zhang & Dang, 2009
Bolivaritettix chinensis Hancock, 1912
Bolivaritettix chongqingensis Zheng & Shi, 2002
Bolivaritettix circinihumerus Zheng, 2003
Bolivaritettix circocephala Zheng, 1992
Bolivaritettix convergens Brunner von Wattenwyl, 1893
Bolivaritettix curvicarina Zheng, 2003
Bolivaritettix darongshanensis Deng, Zheng & Wei, 2009
Bolivaritettix daweishanensis Deng, Zheng & Wei, 2007
Bolivaritettix difficilis Günther, 1939
Bolivaritettix fangjingshanensis Zheng, 1992
Bolivaritettix fugongensis Zheng & Mao, 2002
Bolivaritettix fuscoviridis Ingrisch, 2006
Bolivaritettix galbustrial Zheng, Wei & Li, 2009
Bolivaritettix gaoligongshanensis Zheng & Ou, 2012
Bolivaritettix ghumtianus Hancock, 1915
Bolivaritettix guentheri Ingrisch, 2001
Bolivaritettix guibeiensis Zheng & Jiang, 1994
Bolivaritettix guilinensis Deng, Zheng & Wei, 2007
Bolivaritettix hechiensis Deng, Zheng & Wei, 2008
Bolivaritettix huanjiangensis Zheng & Jiang, 1995
Bolivaritettix humeralis Günther, 1939
Bolivaritettix hutiaoxiana Zheng & Ou, 2003
Bolivaritettix impennis Günther, 1942
Bolivaritettix insignis Kirby, 1914
Bolivaritettix interrupta Zheng & Jiang, 2002
Bolivaritettix javanicus Bolívar, 1909
Bolivaritettix jianfengensis Liang, 2002
Bolivaritettix jinchengjiangensis Zheng, Shi & Mao, 2010
Bolivaritettix jiuwanshanensis Zheng, 2005
Bolivaritettix lanceolatus Ingrisch, 2001
Bolivaritettix laticeps Bolívar, 1909
Bolivaritettix latipulvilus Zheng, Jiang & Liu, 2005
Bolivaritettix lativertex Brunner von Wattenwyl, 1893
Bolivaritettix liboensis Zheng, 2003
Bolivaritettix liuwanshanensis Deng, Zheng & Wei, 2007
Bolivaritettix longitarsus Liang, Chen, Chen & Li, 2008
Bolivaritettix longzhouensis Zheng & Jiang, 1995
Bolivaritettix luchunensis Liang, Chen, Chen & Li, 2008
Bolivaritettix luochengensis Ding, Zheng & Wei, 2006
Bolivaritettix luteolineatus Zheng, 2003
Bolivaritettix medogensis Zheng, 2005
Bolivaritettix menglaensis Zheng, 2006
Bolivaritettix microptera Zheng & Ou, 2003
Bolivaritettix nathani Wagan & Kevan, 1992
Bolivaritettix nigrifemurus Deng, Zheng & Wei, 2007
Bolivaritettix nigripennis Deng, Zheng & Wei, 2007
Bolivaritettix nigritibialis Zheng, 2002
Bolivaritettix nigropennis Deng, Zheng & Wei, 2007
Bolivaritettix nilgirica Hebard, 1930
Bolivaritettix palawanicus Günther, 1939
Bolivaritettix paraguensis Günther, 1939
Bolivaritettix pianmaensis Zheng & Ou, 2003
Bolivaritettix remissa Bolívar, 1887
Bolivaritettix rongshuiensis Zheng & Jiang, 2002
Bolivaritettix roonwali Shishodia, 1991
Bolivaritettix sanbaishanensis Deng, Zheng & Wei, 2010
Bolivaritettix sculpta Bolívar, 1887 - type species (as Mazarredia sculpta Bolívar)
Bolivaritettix serrifemoralis Deng, Zheng & Wei, 2009
Bolivaritettix shiwanshanensis Deng & Zheng, 2015
Bolivaritettix sikkinensis Bolívar, 1909
Bolivaritettix similis Storozhenko, 2018 (Vietnam)
Bolivaritettix tandoni Shishodia, 1991
Bolivaritettix tengchongensis Zheng & Ou, 2011
Bolivaritettix tenuifemura Deng, Zheng & Wei, 2010
Bolivaritettix torulosinota Zheng, 2005
Bolivaritettix tridentate Zheng & Ou, 2003
Bolivaritettix tuberdorsalis Liang, 2002
Bolivaritettix tubericarina Zheng & Jiang, 1995
Bolivaritettix unduladorsalis Zheng & Shi, 2009
Bolivaritettix wuliangshanensis Zheng & Ou, 2003
Bolivaritettix yuanbaoshanensis Zheng & Jiang, 1995
Bolivaritettix yuanjiangensis Zheng & Ou, 2010
Bolivaritettix yunnanensis Zheng & Mao, 2002
Bolivaritettix zangnanensis Zheng & Shi, 2009

References

External links 
 

Tetrigidae
Caelifera genera
Orthoptera of Indo-China